Sphingomonas hankookensis  is a Gram-negative, rod-shaped and non-motile bacteria from the genus of Sphingomonas which has been isolated from wastewater from a wastewater treatment plant in Taejon in Korea.

References

Further reading

External links
Type strain of Sphingomonas hankookensis at BacDive -  the Bacterial Diversity Metadatabase	

hankookensis
Bacteria described in 2009